Folk music is one of the major divisions of music, now often divided into traditional folk music and contemporary folk music.  There are many styles of folk music, all of which can be classified into various traditions, generally based around some combination of ethnic, religious, tribal, political or geographic boundaries.

North, Central, South American and the Caribbean
Asia: East, Southeast, Northern, Central, Caucasus and South Asia
Europe: Northern, Eastern, Southeastern, Western and Southern Europe
Middle East and North Africa: Southwest Asia, North Africa
Oceania and Australia: Polynesia, Australasia, Melanesia, Micronesia
Sub-Saharan Africa: East, Southern, Central and West Africa

As well as dividing songs according to geography, it is possible to categorise them by subject matter:

 War song
 Anti-war song
 Tamang Selo
 Sea songs, including sea shanties
 Drinking song
 Epic song
 Work song
 Love song
 Child Ballads (tragic ballads)
 Children's song 
 Protest song
 Murder ballad
 Sporting song

Other folk music relates to social events:

 Christmas carol
 Pub session

See also 
 

Folk
Folk music